The 1970–71 Bundesliga was the eighth season of the Bundesliga, West Germany's premier football league. It began on 15 August 1970 and ended on 5 June 1971. Borussia Mönchengladbach were the defending champions.

Competition modus
Every team played two games against each other team, one at home and one away. Teams received two points for a win and one point for a draw. If two or more teams were tied on points, places were determined by goal difference and, if still tied, by goals scored. The team with the most points were crowned champions while the two teams with the fewest points were relegated to their respective Regionalliga divisions.

Team changes to 1969–70
TSV 1860 Munich and Alemannia Aachen were relegated to the Regionalliga after finishing in the last two places. They were replaced by Arminia Bielefeld and Kickers Offenbach, who won their respective promotion play-off groups.

Season overview
Borussia Mönchengladbach successfully defended their title. FC Bayern Munich ended up in second place, but not without a title, as they defeated 1. FC Köln in the domestic cup final, thereby qualifying for the Cup Winners' Cup. As a consequence, Bayern's original spot in the newly formed UEFA Cup, to which teams finishing in second to fifth place were permitted to enter, went to Köln. The latter were joined by Hertha BSC, Eintracht Braunschweig and Hamburger SV. The teams demoted to the Regionalliga were Kickers Offenbach and Rot-Weiss Essen.

Bundesliga scandal

Eventually, it was revealed that the decisions in the league had not been determined on the strength of each team alone. On 6 June 1971, Offenbach chairman Horst-Gregorio Canellas played an audio tape to an audience who originally had gathered to celebrate Canellas' 50th birthday. The circle included national team coach Helmut Schön, as well as high DFB representatives and also a few reporters. The tape proved that matches had been sold for money. Soon, the DFB launched its own investigation. It was discovered that a total of 18 games had been fixed, including almost every relevant match in the relegation decision. Over 60 players from ten clubs were involved and nearly one million marks had been paid. Nevertheless, the first verdicts were not spoken until after the start of the following season, meaning that the bribed games officially counted in the final table.

Team overview

League table

Results

Top goalscorers
24 goals
  Lothar Kobluhn (Rot-Weiß Oberhausen)

22 goals
  Gerd Müller (FC Bayern Munich)
  Karl-Heinz Vogt (1. FC Kaiserslautern)

20 goals
  Lorenz Horr (Hertha BSC)
  Herbert Laumen (Borussia Mönchengladbach)

19 goals
  Josef Heynckes (Borussia Mönchengladbach)
  Ferdinand Keller (Hannover 96)
  Willi Lippens (Rot-Weiss Essen)

18 goals
  Lothar Ulsaß (Eintracht Braunschweig)

15 goals
  Klaus Fischer (FC Schalke 04)
  Hartmut Weiß (VfB Stuttgart)

Champion squad

See also
 1970–71 DFB-Pokal

References

External links
 DFB Bundesliga archive 1970/1971

Bundesliga seasons
1
Germany